Johann Phillipp Becker (20 March 1809 – 9 December 1886) was a German revolutionary and military officer who participated in the democratic movement in Germany and Switzerland in the 1830s and 1840s.  In Baden during the 1848-1849 Baden-Palatinate revolution, Becker commanded the Baden Peoples Militia.  In the 1860s he  became a prominent figure in the First Workers International.  Becker became a close friend and an associate of Karl Marx and Frederick Engels.  Becker died in 1886.

References

 Archive of Johann Philipp Becker Papers at the International Institute of Social History

1809 births
1886 deaths
German socialists
German revolutionaries